Fabián Marcelo Hormazábal Berríos (born 26 April 1996) is a Chilean footballer who currently plays for Primera División club O'Higgins as a forward.

Career

Youth career

Hormazábal started his career at Primera División de Chile club O'Higgins. He progressed from the under categories club all the way to the senior team.

O'Higgins

For the 2014–15 season, Hormazábal was promoted for the first team squad of the club. He played 3 matches for 2014–15 Copa Chile and scored a goal against Santiago Wanderers.

Honours
O'Higgins
 Supercopa de Chile: 2014 

Curicó Unido
 Primera B: 2016–17

References

External links
 
 

1996 births
Living people
Chilean people of Basque descent
Chilean footballers
Chilean Primera División players
Primera B de Chile players
O'Higgins F.C. footballers
Curicó Unido footballers
Deportes La Serena footballers
Association football forwards